The 1978–79 Toledo Rockets men's basketball team represented University of Toledo as a member of the Mid-American Conference during the 1978–79 NCAA Division I men's basketball season. The team was led by head coach Bob Nichols and played their home games at Centennial Hall in Toledo, Ohio. Toledo won the MAC championship, reached the Sweet Sixteen of the NCAA Tournament for the only time in program history, and finished with a record of 22–8 (13–3 MAC).

Roster

Schedule

|-
!colspan=9 style=| Regular season

|-
!colspan=9 style=| NCAA Tournament

Rankings

References 

1978–79 Mid-American Conference men's basketball season
1978–79
Toledo
Toledo Rockets men's basketball
Toledo Rockets men's basketball